Govindchar Raghu Achar is an Indian National Congress political activist and member of the Karnataka Legislative Council.

See also 
 TA/DA scam

References

External links 
G. Raghu Achar affidavit

Living people
Members of the Karnataka Legislative Council
Indian National Congress politicians from Karnataka
1978 births